Indian School Muscat (abbreviated: ISM) is an Indian school in the Darsait area of Muscat, Oman.

The school is a non commercial organization established and funded by the local Indian community and parents. It is managed by a group of 15-21 honorary members (known as SMC) appointed by the board of directors (known as apex body) formed according to the by-laws of Indian schools in Oman approved by the government of Oman. The school is affiliated with the Central Board of Secondary Education, New Delhi, India.

History
It was founded in 1975 as the Central Indian School with 135 students. Qaboos bin Said al Said, the ruler of the Sultanate of Oman granted land in Darsait that enabled the school to be established. Since then, the school has grown quickly, both in terms of enrollment and size. As of 2010, the school had an enrollment of over 8,500 students. The primary school is now being taken as two shifts taking into consideration the number of enrollments.  The school has two auditoriums, three libraries, four computer labs, indoor facilities, two basketball courts, and a football ground.

Indian School Muscat alumni
Indian School Muscat Alumni (ISMA) was established on 17 December 1997.

The primary objective of ISMA is to support the school in initiatives to foster friendship and fellowship among the students, teachers and alumni. ISMA hosts professional, social and cultural events for the benefit of its members. ISMA provides loyalty benefits to its members through corporate programs.

ISMA has launched a Sponsor a Student initiative - KINDLE, which is a platform to help fund the education and advancement of children from homes of low income families

Notable alumni include tennis player Mahesh Bhupathi, Oman cricketer Jatinder Singh, and actress Sneha Ullal. Additionally, Sanam Puri, Bollywood singer, and his band members of band Sanam, Mr. Venkat Subarmanium and Mr. Samar Puri, actress Sarah Jane Dias, and entrepreneur Kevin Swali.

Student activities
The school is a member of the Duke of Edinburgh's Award. The scheme was launched on 18 November 1992 with 23 girls and 20 boys from the school. The school over 300 award entrants, who take part in confidence, character and team building activities including social / community service and group excursions.

The school has a student government system, which consists of a student council and prefects. Prefects and the members of the Student Council are generally elected by the students and are then interviewed by the senior staff members. The school has an active charity club that has helped local charity organizations by conducting events to generate funds.

ISM is known for organizing carnivals, charity events and concerts to help the local community. They also host several inter-school events such as Jhankar Spectrum every year. Jhankar Spectrum 2016 had some 1,500  students who showcased their talent including as they competed in 27 events at 17 different venues in the school premises.

The student council consists of 20 members (10 boys and 10 girls) elected by the students and then interviewed by the faculty.

References 

Educational institutions established in 1975
Indian international schools in Oman